Walter William Walker (1879–unknown) was an English footballer who played in the Football League for West Bromwich Albion.

References

1879 births
date of death unknown
English footballers
Association football forwards
English Football League players
Dudley Town F.C. players
West Bromwich Albion F.C. players
Brierley Hill Alliance F.C. players